Saline County Courthouse may refer to:

Saline County Courthouse (Arkansas), Benton, Arkansas
Saline County Courthouse (Kansas), Salina, Kansas
Saline County Courthouse (Missouri), Marshall, Missouri
Saline County Courthouse (Nebraska), Wilber, Nebraska